Saher is either a feminine given name of Arabic origin, common throughout the Persian-speaking and Muslim worlds, or unisex given name of Hebrew origin, used mainly in Israel. Though the Arabic and Hebrew names are phonologically identical and both derive from Semitic languages, they are nonetheless etymologically unrelated. In Arabic, the name means "just before dawn", coming from a common Semitic root meaning "dawn" (compare with Shahar, the Ugaritic god of the dawn). The origin of the Hebrew name is an ancient Akkadian word for the crescent moon.

The Arabic-origin name is mainly used by Persian, Arabic, Azeri, Turkish, Urdu, and Pashto speakers. "Seher" is the way it would be commonly spelled in Turkey and Azerbaijan.  

Notable people with the name include:

Given name

 Sahar Baassiri, Lebanese journalist
 Sahar Biniaz (born 1986), Canadian model
 Sahar Delijani (born 1983), Iranian author
 Sahar Dolatshahi (born 1979), Iranian actress
 Sahar El Hawari, Egyptian football referee
 Sahar Gul (born c. 1998), Afghan child bride
 Sahar Hashemi, British entrepreneur
 Sahar Hussein al-Haideri (1962–2007), Iraqi journalist
 Sahar Khalifeh (born 1942), Palestinian writer
 Sahar Taha (born 1963), Iraqi musician
 Sahar Tawfiq (born 1951), Egyptian writer
 Sahar Valadbeigi (born 1978), Iranian actress
 Sahar Youssef (born 1968), Egyptian swimmer
 Sahar Zakaria (born 1973), Iranian actress
 Sahar Maher Abd al-Rashid, wife of Qusay Hussein

Surname
 Ben Sahar (born 1995), Israeli football player
 Muhamad Hasik bin Sahar (born 1980), Singaporean convicted killer and gang member of Salakau
 Hailie Sahar (born 1988), American actress

References

Arabic feminine given names
Pakistani feminine given names
Persian feminine given names
Turkish feminine given names